Jerome W. Marks (June 22, 1915 – March 9, 2011) was an American politician who served in the New York State Assembly from 1963 to 1968.

He died on March 9, 2011, in Manhattan, New York City, New York at age 95.

References

1915 births
2011 deaths
Democratic Party members of the New York State Assembly
Politicians from New York City